Leo Rogin (1893, Mohilev, Belarus – 1947, Berkeley, CA, USA) was an American economist, economic historian and historian of economic thought.

Major publications

 "The Introduction of Farm Machinery in its Relation to the Productivity of Labor in the Agriculture of the United States During the 19th Century", 1931.
 "Werner Sombart and the 'Natural Science Method' in Economics", JPE, 1933.
 "American Economic Thought", AER, 1933.
 "The New Deal: A Survey of the Literature", QJE, 1935.
 "Davenport on the Economics of Alfred Marshall", AER, 1936.
 "The Significance of Marxian Economics for Current Trends of Government Policy", AER, 1938.
 "Werner Sombart and Transcendentalism", AER, 1941.
 "Marx and Engels on Distribution in a Socialist Society", AER, 1945.
 "The Meaning and Validity of Economic Theory: A Historical Approach", 1956.

Secondary sources
 Blaug, Mark (1962, 1st ed.) Economic Theory in Retrospect.
 Hutchison, Terence W. (1978) - On Revolutions and Progress in Economic Knowledge.

References

External links
 1947, University of California: In Memoriam.
 Where Galbraith's Ideas Come From, Speech delivered by Richard Parker at The Galbraith International Symposium Paris, France, September 22-25, 2004
 Douglass C. North's Autobiography on Nobelprize.org

20th-century American economists
Historians of economic thought
1893 births
1947 deaths
Soviet emigrants to the United States
Lawrence University faculty
Belarusian Jews
People from Mogilev